Ust-Chukurya is a rural locality (a village) in Gaynskoye Rural Settlement, Gaynsky District, Perm Krai, Russia. The population was 4 as of 2010.

Geography 
Ust-Chukurya is located 27 km west of Gayny (the district's administrative centre) by road. Ust-Veslyana is the nearest rural locality.

References 

Rural localities in Gaynsky District